Nino Camardo (born 24 February 1949 in Pisticci), italian naïve art painter.

Biography
Born in Pisticci in the province of Matera on 24 February 1949, he paints subjects that speak a naïve art language, tells stories of love, poetry, with primitive expression. The path behind Camardo began in the seventies of the twentieth century, and receiving recognition from art critics, among the most important prizes were the Prize of the Centro Studi di Roma, the Art in the World Prize; exhibits at the Palazzo delle Esposizioni in Rome. It is mentioned in publications on art including several editions of The Great Masters of the History of Art and in the Bolaffi National Catalog of naïve art. He currently lives in Tuscany and is still in full artistic production.

Bibliography 
 Catalogo nazionale Bolaffi, d'arte moderna, n.8, 1973.
 Catalogo Novecento, profili di artisti contemporanei.
 Catalogo d'Arte GELMI.
 Catalogo nazionale Bolaffi dei naifs, n.2, Giulio Bolaffi Editore.
 Monografia, Nino Camardo, 1976.
 Monografia, Nino Camardo, 1980, by  Margonari, Renzo.
 Monografia, Nino Camardo, Palazzo delle Esposizioni del comune di Roma, 5 - 20 giugno 1975.
 Catalogo, Mostra personale di Nino Camardo : pittore naif : dal 5 al 16 febbraio 1971.
 Monografia, Nino Camardo, pittore naif, a cura della Associazione culturale Campano-Lucana.
 Atlante dell'Arte Contemporanea, Edizioni DeAgostini, 2020.

Notes

External links

 Nino Camardo on Artprice.com
 Nino Camardo on Archivio Bioiconografico GNAM, Roma

20th-century Italian painters
Italian male painters
21st-century Italian painters
Italian contemporary artists
1949 births
Living people
People from the Province of Matera
20th-century Italian male artists
21st-century Italian male artists